Peter Marrin (born August 8, 1953) is a Canadian former professional ice hockey player who played 277 games in the World Hockey Association.  During his career he played with the Toronto Toros and Birmingham Bulls. As a youth, he played in the 1966 Quebec International Pee-Wee Hockey Tournament with the Toronto Weston minor ice hockey team.

References

External links

1953 births
Ice hockey people from Toronto
Birmingham Bulls players
Birmingham Bulls (CHL) players
Canadian ice hockey centres
Fredericton Express players
Hershey Bears players
Mohawk Valley Comets (NAHL) players
Montreal Canadiens draft picks
Syracuse Firebirds players
Toronto Marlboros players
Toronto Toros draft picks
Toronto Toros players
Living people